Isabel Alejandra Aboy Ferrer (born May 4, 1982) is a Spanish actress. She became known in 1995, at age 13, following her role in the successful Telecinco series Médico de familia (Family Doctor) playing María, the eldest daughter of character Emilio Aragón, for five years.

Education and career
After a period away from acting, Isabel Aboy signed on to Periodistas in 2001, where she played the scholar, Berta for the last two seasons of the production, also from Telecinco.

Since then, she has devoted herself to her studies in psychology, a career in which she is licensed, as well as small modelling jobs until she got her first chance in theatre. She was in Médico de familia (Family Doctor) in 2004 through the efforts of one of her colleagues, Louisa Martin (remembered from the Juani series). Together they starred in Historia de una vida (Life Story).

In 2007, Elizabeth would again appear on stage and again work along with a fellow actor from Médico de familia Antonio Valero. This time, the work was entitled La mujer que se parecía a Marilyn (The Woman who Looked Like Marilyn).

In March 2007 a report appeared in the Telecinco's El Buscador program about child actors in which she spoke of her experience in Médico de familia. In 2008 she opened in the play Al otro lado del tabique (Across the Wall) at the Teatro Lara in Madrid.

Personal life
She married Javier Guimón in January 2010 and subsequently produced their first child, a daughter.

In 2016 she and her husband had twins.

Currently, he works as a psychologist in the Protégeles foundation, specializing in the section on Internet safety, bullying and eating disorders.

Career

Television
 As an actress
 Médico de familia (1995-1999). Telecinco. As María Martín Soller.
 Periodistas (2001-2002) Telecinco. As Berta Rocha.

 As a guest on programs
 Crónicas Marcianas (1999), Telecinco
 Lo + Plus (2001), Canal Plus
 Pasapalabra (2005), Antena 3
 Arucitys (2005), City TV
 El Club (2005), Televisió de Catalunya (TV3)
 Password, Cuatro
 Pasapalabra (2008, 2009), Telecinco
 ¡Qué tiempo tan feliz! (2011),  Telecinco

Theatre
 Historia de una vida (2004)
 La mujer que se parecía a Marilyn (2007)

References

External links 
 
 2004 Interview (in Spanish)
 2007 Interview (in Spanish)

Spanish stage actresses
Spanish television actresses
Actresses from Madrid
1982 births
Living people
Spanish child actresses
20th-century Spanish actresses
21st-century Spanish actresses